This article is about the particular significance of the century 1601–1700 to Wales and its people.

Princes of Wales
Henry (1610-1612)
Charles (later Charles I) (1616-1625)
Charles (later Charles II) (1630-1649)
James (1688)

Princesses of Wales
none

Events
1601
June - John Salusbury is knighted by Queen Elizabeth I of England for his assistance in suppressing the Essex Rebellion.
October
The "Wrexham riot" occurs, when supporters of Sir John Salusbury are involved in violent clashes with surviving Essex supporters led by Sir Richard Trevor.
William Morgan, Bishop of Llandaff, becomes Bishop of St Asaph.
22 November - Francis Godwin is consecrated the new Bishop of Llandaff.
December - Sir John Salusbury becomes MP for Denbighshire.
James Price (of Pilleth) becomes High Sheriff of Radnorshire for the first time.
1602
7 July - Sir Richard Bulkeley is appointed to the Council of Wales and the Marches.
17 July - The Lord Lieutenancy of Monmouthshire is separated from that of Wales and is held by Edward Somerset, 4th Earl of Worcester.
Sir Edmund Morgan (of Llandaff) is High Sheriff of Monmouthshire.
1603
24 March - Henry Frederick, son of King James I of England, is invested as Duke of Cornwall upon his father's accession.
date unknown - David Hughes founds Beaumaris Grammar School.
1604
27 February - Roger Brereton of Borras becomes MP for Flint.
Carmarthen is made a county corporate by charter of King James I of England.
Thomas Myddelton becomes Sheriff of London.
John Davies becomes rector of Mallwyd.
Sir Richard Bulkeley is elected MP for Anglesey.
1605
January - Catholic plotter Thomas Morgan (of Llantarnam) is condemned to death for his part in a conspiracy involving Catherine Henriette de Balzac d'Entragues, but the sentence is not carried out.
8 March - Sir Eubule Thelwall is appointed steward and recorder of Ruthin for life.
The earldom of Montgomery is created for Philip Herbert, a favourite of King James I of England.
1606
12 April - A new Union Flag is created by royal decree to mark the union between England and Scotland; Wales is not represented in the design. 
31 October - John Griffith, later MP for Beaumaris, matriculates at Brasenose College, Oxford, aged 15.
date unknown 
Hawarden High School is founded as a single-classroom grammar school with £300 left by local resident George Ledsham.
William Spurstow, MP, is instrumental in the passing of a bill to relieve Welsh cloth from the need to have a seal of content.
A storm buries the village of St Ismail near modern-day Kidwelly, Carmarthenshire.
John Wynn, eldest son of Sir John Wynn, 1st Baronet, marries Eleanor Cave.
1607
30 January - Bristol Channel floods cause devastation on the Welsh coast, from Laugharne in Carmarthenshire to above Chepstow in Monmouthshire. Cardiff was the most badly affected town, with the foundations of St Mary's Church destroyed.
26 March - Peter Mutton is granted the reversion of the office of Attorney General in Wales and Shropshire, Herefordshire, Gloucestershire, Worcestershire, Cheshire, and Flintshire for life.
11 May - Marriage of Blanche Somerset, daughter of the Earl of Worcester, and Thomas Arundell, 2nd Baron Arundell of Wardour.
date unknown
Serious outbreak of plague in Conwy.
Walter Jones, of a family of Welsh wool merchants, begins the construction of Chastleton House in Oxfordshire.
1608
7 November - Charles Vaughan (of Porthamal) is knighted.
26 November - Peter Wynne, a member of Captain Christopher Newport's exploration party to the villages of the Eastern Siouan Monacan above the falls of the James River in Virginia, writes to John Egerton, 1st Earl of Bridgewater, informing him that some members of Newport's party believe the pronunciation of the Monacans' language resembles "Welch", and have asked Wynne to act as interpreter.
Richard Wynn, the future 2nd Baronet, enters the service of the Lord Chamberlain in London.
1610
4 June - Henry Stuart is created Prince of Wales and Earl of Chester.
date unknown
Plas Teg is built by Sir John Trevor near the village of Pontblyddyn, Flintshire.
The Old Church of St Gwenllwyfo, Llanwenllwyfo, undergoes restoration work, as shown by the date of the oak screen and pulpit.
Ewenny Pottery started.
Approximate date of Kennixton Farmhouse, now located at St Fagans National History Museum near Cardiff. 
1611
29 June - Creation of the Wynn Baronetcy for Sir John Wynn.
William Lewis Annwill, of the Anwyl of Tywyn Family, has his pedigree certified by William Hughes and John Davies.
John Jones of Gellilyfdy is placed in a debtors' prison in London.
1612
Sir Thomas Button winters at the mouth of the Nelson River in Canada, naming it after the ship's sailing master, who had died.
1613
29 September - Official opening of the New River, supplying London with fresh water. Sir Hugh Myddelton, who has been instrumental in its creation, is the brother of Sir Thomas Myddelton, Lord Mayor of London in the same year. 
1614
26 December - The will of haberdasher William Jones leaves "nyne thousand pounds to the Company of Haberdashers of London to ordain a Preacher, a Free School and Alms houses for twenty poor and distressed people, as blind and lame as it shall seem best to them, of the Town of Monmouth, where it shall be bestowed". Monmouth School and the Monmouth Alms Houses are among the establishments founded as a result.
Beaumaris Courthouse built.
Marmaduke Lloyd becomes King's Attorney for the Marches and is appointed to the Council of Wales and the Marches.
1615
Wye Bridge, Monmouth, is rebuilt in stone.
1616 
November - Charles Stuart is created Prince of Wales and Earl of Chester, four years after the death of his elder brother.
Thomas Gerard, 1st Baron Gerard, is appointed President of the Council of Wales and the Marches, replacing Ralph Eure, 3rd Baron Eure.
1617
William Compton, 1st Earl of Northampton, becomes President of the Council of Wales and the Marches.
Sir Richard Wynn, 2nd Baronet, becomes Groom of the Bedchamber to Charles, Prince of Wales, retaining the position until the prince becomes King Charles I in 1625.
Richard Whitbourne is recruited by William Vaughan to govern his new colony of Cambriol.
1618
John Griffith is appointed High Sheriff of Caernarvonshire. Sir John Wynn, 1st Baronet, becomes Custos Rotulorum of Caernarvonshire.
1619
Mostyn Colliery is recorded as being worth approximately £700 annually to the Mostyn family, which suggests a fairly substantial output.
1620
Bishop William Morgan's Bible translation into Welsh is revised by Bishop Richard Parry and John Davies (Mallwyd) as Y Bibl Cyssegr-lan, published in London.
1621
New MPs include Lewis Powell, William Herbert, Henry Vaughan and John Trevor.
1622
William Vaughan arrives in Cambriol to begin a stay of three years, during which he writes The Golden Fleece.
1623
Sir Richard Wynn, 2nd Baronet, is one of the party accompanying the Prince of Wales to Spain.  His account of the journey was published a century later. 
1625
8 July - A deputation including Sir Sackville Trevor takes a petition to King Charles I.
1627
June - Sir Sackville Trevor serves with distinction in the expedition to La Rochelle led by George Villiers, 1st Duke of Buckingham.
September - Sir Sackville Trevor leads a flotilla that blockaded the mouth of the Elbe in support of the land force sent under Sir Charles Morgan to assist King Christian IV of Denmark.
1636
The three-arch stone bridge, Pont Fawr, at Llanrwst is built by Sir John Wynn of Gwydir Castle; its design is attributed to Inigo Jones.
1638
Bont Fawr at Dolgellau built.
1639
Abergavenny receives its charter of incorporation. 
1640
date unknown - Godfrey Goodman, Bishop of Gloucester, is imprisoned for 5 weeks for refusing to sign the oath known as the Laudian canons.
1643
September - Vavasor Powell leads a march of eighty men to Machynlleth.
9 November - Thomas Myddelton takes Farndon Bridge at Holt on behalf of Parliament.
1644
January - Thomas Fairfax breaks the six-week siege of Nantwich.
September - The first battle of the English Civil War on Welsh soil takes place at Montgomery.
Thomas Bulkeley is created 1st Viscount Bulkeley in recognition of his service to the Royalist cause in the English Civil War.
Roch Castle is captured by Parliament; the owner's daughter, Lucy Walter, flees to London and thence to The Hague.
1645
4 February - Jeremy Taylor is among the Royalist prisoners taken during the siege of Cardigan Castle.
June - King Charles I of England begins a tour of South Wales, in the wake of his defeat at the Battle of Naseby, to rally support.
16 July - King Charles I dines with the Morgans at Tredegar Park.
25 July - King Charles I is entertained by the Morgans of Ruperra Castle.
5 August - King Charles I visits Colonel Edward Prichard at Llancaiach Fawr.
September - King Charles I visits Denbigh.
1646
19 August - Raglan Castle surrenders to Parliamentary forces.
October - Colonel William Salusbury surrenders Denbigh Castle to Parliamentary forces, with the king's written permission.
Barrister William Philipps buys the island of Skokholm for £300.
1647
19 January - Holt Castle surrenders to Parliamentary forces after an 11-month siege.
16 March - Harlech Castle surrenders to Parliamentary forces, the last Royalist stronghold of the English Civil War on mainland Britain.
date unknown - Katherine Fowler ("Orinda") marries James Philips of Cardigan Priory.
1648
8 May - Battle of St. Fagans
1649
January - Thomas Wogan and John Jones Maesygarnedd are among the signatories to the death warrant of King Charles I.
April - Rowland Laugharne, John Poyer and Rice Powell, former Parliamentary commanders, are condemned to death for their role in the rebellion leading to the Battle of St Fagans. They draw lots and the sentence is carried out only on Colonel Poyer.
9 April - Lucy Walter, mistress of the Prince of Wales, gives birth to the future Duke of Monmouth.
Aberystwyth Castle slighted by Commonwealth troops.
1650
22 February - The Act for the better propagation and preaching of the Gospel in Wales is passed by Parliament, resulting in the ejection of dissident clergymen and creating English-language schools.
1656
date unknown - Colonel Philip Jones buys Fonmon Castle from the St John family.
1657
George Fox visits Dolgellau, resulting in the foundation of a local Quaker community, led by Rowland Ellis.
Jenkin Jones becomes minister at Llanddetty.
1659
5 August - Booth's Rebellion proclaims Charles II as King. Its leaders include Thomas Myddelton of Chirk Castle.
19 August - Booth's forces take Chester.
1660
23 July - Creation of the Aubrey baronets of Llantrithead
17 October - Hugh Lloyd becomes Bishop of Llandaff.
William Philipps is elected MP for Haverfordwest.
At about this date, Elizabeth Cromwell (widow of Oliver) retires to Wales.
1661
20 April - Royalist Arthur Annesley is created Earl of Anglesey.
Bridge at Carrog built over Dee.
1662
Henry Walter and Charles Edwards are among the ministers ejected as a result of the Act of Uniformity.
1663
Baptist leader John Myles takes the Ilston Book with him when he and his whole congregation emigrate to North America, where they found the First Baptist Church in Swansea.
Bangor Bridge built at Bangor-on-Dee.
1664
Thomas Wogan, former Parliamentary commander and regicide, escapes from York Castle and flees to the Netherlands.
1666
Last recorded news of Thomas Wogan, resident in Utrecht and plotting against King Charles II. 
1667
Francis Davies becomes Bishop of Llandaff.
1668
Rhydwilym Baptist Chapel in Llangolman is founded.
1669
Henry Morgan lands on Île-à-Vache and begins using it as the base for his piracy.
1673
17 June - Land for a Friends meeting house at The Pales in Powys is acquired; by the early 21st century it will be Wales's oldest in continuous use.
1678
The gardens of Bodysgallen Hall are laid out.
17 November - During the Popish Plot John Arnold of Monmouthshire captures Jesuit priest David Lewis at St Michael's Church, Llantarnam.
1679
27 August - Jesuit priest David Lewis (b. 1616) is hanged at Usk for high treason. He will be canonized in 1970.
1680
9 September - Regicide Henry Marten dies a prisoner in Chepstow Castle.
1681
12 September - Great fire at Presteigne.
1682
30 August - A group of Welsh settlers, including Thomas Wynne, set sail for Pennsylvania. Settlement of Bala Cynwyd begins.
14 September - Bishop Gore School is founded in Swansea by Bishop Hugh Gore.
1686
Rowland Ellis and his fellow Quakers leave Wales for Pennsylvania to avoid religious persecution.
1688
10 December - Mary of Modena, queen consort of King James II of England, flees to France, taking with her the six-month-old James Francis Edward Stuart, Prince of Wales.
The chief officers of the corporation of Abergavenny refuse to take the oath of allegiance to King William III, and the town's charter is annulled.
1689
25 July - Council of Wales and the Marches is abolished.
1690
27 December - great fire at Builth.
date unknown
Blast furnace at Coed Ithel.
Jenkin Lewis is appointed personal servant to Prince William, Duke of Gloucester, second in line to the throne.
1694
7 January - Following the death of the incumbent, Charles Gerard, 1st Earl of Macclesfield, the Lord Lieutenancy of Wales is divided between North and South Wales.  
1695
7 March - Sir John Trevor, Speaker of the House of Commons, is found guilty of taking a bribe and expelled from the Commons.
1697
Pont Cysylltau built.
1699
Bryn Celli Ddu is plundered by grave robbers.
American-born East India merchant Elihu Yale returns to his family home at Plas Grono near Wrexham where he spends much of the rest of his life.
1700
Quaker emigrant Rowland Ellis is elected to represent Philadelphia in the provincial assembly.

Arts and literature

Books
1600
Robert Holland - 
William Vaughan - Golden Grove
1603
John Davies of Hereford - Microcosmos
'P.G.' - A most strange and true report of a monsterous fish, who appeared in the forme of a woman, from her waste upwards
Wiliam Midleton - 
George Owen of Henllys - The Description of Pembrokeshire
1611
Lewis Bayly - Practice of Piety
1613
Lewis Dwnn - Heraldic Visitations of the Three Counties of North Wales above Conway
1615
"R.A., Gent." (Robert Anton, Robert Aylett or Robert Armin?) - The Valiant Welshman, or the true Chronicle History of the Life and Valiant Deedes of Caradoc the Great, King of Cambria, now called Wales. As it hath beene sundry times acted by the Prince of Wales his Servants
1616
Rhosier Smyth - 
1618
Ben Jonson - For the Honour of Wales (masque, first performed February 17)
1621
Edmwnd Prys - Salmau Cân
1630
Rowland Vaughan - '1632
John Davies (Mallwyd) - Dictionarium duplex1636
Sir Thomas Salusbury, 2nd Baronet - The History of Joseph1645
James Howell - Epistolae Ho-Elianae, vol. 1
1650
James Howell - Epistolae Ho-Elianae, vol. 3
Henry Vaughan - Silex scintillans, part 1 
1651
Henry Vaughan - Olor Iscanus1652
Henry Vaughan - The Mount of Olives1653
William Erbery - A Mad Mans PleaMorgan Llwyd - 1654
Alexander Griffith Strena Vavasoriensis; or, a New Year's Gift for the Welsh Itinerants. Or an Hue and Cry after Mr. Vavasor Powell, Metropolitan of the Itinerants, and one of the Executioners of the Gospel by Colour of the late Act for the Propagation thereof in WalesTrue and Perfect Relation of the whole Transaction concerning the Petition of the Six Counties of South Wales, and the County of Monmouth1655
Morgan Llwyd - 1657
Morgan Llwyd - 1658
Rowland Vaughan - 1660
Rowland Vaughan - 1678
Henry Vaughan - Thalia Rediviva1688Births
1601
James Lewis, MP for Cardiganshire 
1602date unknown - Sir John Glynne, judge (d. 1666)probable - Henry Wynn, MP for Merioneth (d. 1671)
1603date unknown - Richard Jones, Anglican priest and writer (d. c.1655)
1604
4 May - Sir Hugh Owen, 1st Baronet, politician (d. 1670)date unknown 
William Erbery, theologian (d. 1654)
Thomas Hughes, politician (d. 1664)
Sir Thomas Morgan, 1st Baronet, soldier (d. 1679)probable - Richard Herbert, 2nd Baron Herbert of Chirbury, Royalist soldier and politician (d. 1655)
1605
14 March - Francis Davies, Bishop of Llandaff (d. 1675)date unknown - Herbert Price, politician (d. 1678)probable - John Edwards (Siôn Treredyn), priest and translator (d. 1656)
1607date unknown - Kenrick Eyton, lawyer and politician (d. 1681)
1608date unknown - Robert Morgan, Bishop of Bangor (d. 1673)probable 
Arthur Owen, politician (d. 1678)
Thomas Powell, priest and writer (d. 1660)
1610
July/August - Humphrey Lloyd, Bishop of Bangor (d. 1689)date unknown 
William Foxwist, judge and politician (d. c. 1673)
Robert Pugh, Jesuit priest and controversialist (d. 1679)
1611date unknown - Henry Walter, Puritan priest (d. c.1678)
1613
2 February - William Thomas, Bishop of St David's (d. 1689) date unknown - Henry Vaughan the younger, MP (d. 1676)
1615date unknown - Jonathan Edwards, priest and brother-in-law of John Jones Maesygarnedd (d. 1681)
1617date unknown - Vavasor Powell, religious writer (d. 1670)probable -  George Probert, AS (m. 1677)
1619date unknown 
Morgan Llwyd, writer (d. 1659)
William Price, Royalist colonel (d. 1691)
1620approx. date - William Maurice, antiquary (d. 1680)
1621
17 April 
Henry Vaughan, poet (d. 1695)
Thomas Vaughan, philosopher (d. 1666)
1627
20 July - Thomas Wynne, personal physician of William Penn (d. 1691)
c.1630
Lucy Walter, mistress of Charles II of England (d. 1658)
1634date unknown - William Williams, politician (d. 1700)
1649
5 April - Elihu Yale, founder of Yale University (d. 1721)
9 April - James Scott, 1st Duke of Monmouth, son of the future King Charles II of England and Lucy Walter (d. 1685)
1655date unknown - Henry Rowlands, antiquary (d. 1723)
1671date unknown - Ellis Wynne, priest and author (d. 1734)
1674
18 October - Beau Nash, leader of fashion (d. 1762)
1675date unknown – William Jones, mathematician (d. 1749)
1677
16 July – Angharad James, poet (d. 1749)
1682
17 May – Bartholomew Roberts, pirate ("Black Bart") (d. 1722)
1683
1 March – Caroline of Ansbach, future Princess of Wales (d. 1737)
10 November - Prince George of Hanover, future Prince of Wales (d. 1760)
1684
early – Griffith Jones, religious minister and educationalist (d. 1761)
1688
1 November - Morgan Morgan, American colonist 
1693
February – Theophilus Evans, historian (d. 1767)
6 April – Hugh Hughes, poet ("Y Bardd Coch o Fôn"; d. 1776)
1696date unknown - Marged ferch Ifan, harpist and wrestler (d. 1793)
1697date unknown – Thomas William, minister and writer (d. 1778)
1698
30 October (baptised) – Bridget Bevan, educationalist and public benefactor (d. 1779)
1699
15 May – Sampson Lloyd, Welsh-descended banker (d. 1779)
8 November – Sir Erasmus Philipps, 5th Baronet, of Picton Castle, politician (d. 1743)
1700
8 March – William Morgan the elder, of Tredegar, politician (d. 1731)date unknown - Guto Nyth Brân, legendary athlete (d. 1737)probable – Lewis Evans, surveyor (d. 1756)

Deaths
1601
19 January – Henry Herbert, 2nd Earl of Pembroke, Lord President of Wales, about 63
13 March – Sir Gelli Meyrick, executed for his part in Essex's rebellion, about 45
17 June – Gabriel Goodman, Dean of Westminster, 72
17 October – Hugh Lloyd, head of Winchester College, 54/5date unknown – Owen Holland, MP for Anglesey
1602
3 April – Siôn Tudur, Welsh language poet, about 80
3 June – Francis Bevans, Principal of Jesus College, Oxford, 71/72
after May – John Price, politician
1603date unknown 
Thomas Floyd, writer
Philip Jones, politician
Matthew Herbert, Monmouthshire landowner and politician
Thomas Morgan, politicianprobable - Richard Herbert, politician
1604
6 January - Henry Williams (alias Cromwell), knight of Welsh descent, 66/7
10 September - Bishop William Morgan, Bible translator, 59date unknown - Meredith Hanmer, controversialist, historian, and translator, about 60
1606date unknownJohn Lloyd, MP for Denbighshire, mid-50s
Simwnt Fychan, poet, c.75
Thomas Morgan (of Llantarnam), Catholic spy
1607
19 January - Anne Morgan, Baroness Hunsdon, 77/8
30 March - Richard Vaughan, Bishop of London, about 57date unknown - Thomas Lewis (of Harpton), politician
1609
26 March - John Dee, mathematician and occultist
15 May – Sir Edward Stradling, politician, antiquary and literary patron, c. 80
July - Hugh Hughes, politiciandate unknown 
John Griffith (of Cefnamlwch), politician
Twm Siôn Cati, outlaw, about 77probable - Siôn Dafydd Rhys, physician and grammarian, about 75
1610
17 May - Gervase Babington, Bishop of Llandaff 1591-94
10 December - John Roberts, Catholic martyr (executed)probable - Edward James, priest and translator
1611date unknownHenry Adams, MP for Pembroke
Gabriel Powell, Anglican priest
1612
24 July - Sir John Salusbury, poet and politician, 45
6 November - Henry Frederick, Prince of Wales, 18date unknown - Robert Parry, poet, romancier and translator 
1613
26 August - George Owen of Henllys, antiquary, 61
4 September - John Williams, principal of Jesus College, Oxforddate unknown - Owen ap Hugh, MP for Newborough
1615
January - William Jones, haberdasher and philanthropist, c.65
12 April - William Lower, astronomer, 45date unknown - George Lloyd, Bishop of Chester
1616
30 May - Sir Thomas Parry, diplomat, 75
6 July - Henry Rowlands, Bishop of Bangor, 64/5
1617date unknown - Henry Perry, linguistic scholar and priest
1618
July - John Davies of Hereford, poet, 53
13 December - Roger Puleston, politician, 53 
1620
June - Griffith Powell, principal of Jesus College, Oxford, 58/9
1621
24 May - Barbara Sidney, Countess of Leicester, 57
28 June - Sir Richard Bulkeley, politician, 88
1622date unknown - John Owen, epigrammatist
1626
10 December - Edmund Gunter, mathematician
1627
1 March - Sir John Wynn, 1st Baronet
1629
27 March - Sir John Philipps, 1st Baronet
1630
8 October - Sir Eubule Thelwall, lawyer, academic and politician
1631
10 December - Sir Hugh Myddelton, goldsmith and hydraulic engineer
1633 probable - Sir Sackville Trevor, sea captain
1634
April - Sir Thomas Button, explorer and admiral
23 August (buried) - Tomos Prys, poet
1636date unknown - John Lougher, MP for Pembroke
1641
August - William Vaughan, writer and colonist
1644
December - Rhys Prichard ("Yr Hen Ficer"), 65
1646
30 June - Philip Powell, Catholic martyr, 52 (executed)
1649
30 January - Charles I of England, former Prince of Wales, 48 (executed)
24 April - John Poyer, rebel commander (executed)
1650
25 March - John Williams, Archbishop of York, 68
March/April - Thomas Howell (Bishop of Bristol), 62
1656
9 June - Thomas Tomkins, composer
1658
September/October - Lucy Walter, former mistress of King Charles II 
1659
3 June - Morgan Llwyd, Puritan preacher and writer
1660
13 August - Sir Owen Wynn, 3rd Baronet, 68
13 October (or 17) - John Jones Maesygarnedd, regicide (executed) 
31 December – Thomas Powell, Welsh writer and cleric, 52/53 (born c. 1608)
1663
6 December - David Jenkins, judge
1664
22 June - Katherine Philips, poet, 33
1670
27 October - Vavasor Powell, Nonconformist leader and writer
1674
5 September - Colonel Philip Jones of Fonmon, 56?
1675
16 November (buried) - Rowland Laugharne, soldier
1676
26 December - Henry Vaughan, politician, 63
1677
2 November - Robert Sidney, 2nd Earl of Leicester, son of Robert Sidney, 1st Earl of Leicester, and Barbara Gamage
21 December - John Parry, Bishop of Ossory
1679
10 March - Francis Howell, Principal of Jesus College, Oxford, 54
13 April - Sir Thomas Morgan, 1st Baronet, soldier, 75
22 July - Philip Evans and John Lloyd, Roman Catholic priests (executed at Cardiff)
1680
27 March - William Maurice, antiquary (b. c.1620)
28 April - William Morgan (of Machen and Tredegar), politician
1681
18 December - Edward Turberville, informer
1682
8 October – Thomas Jones, priest
1683
24 August – John Owen, theologian. 67?
29 August – Philip Herbert, 7th Earl of Pembrokedate unknown – Edward Vaughan (MP)
1685
6 February – King Charles II of England, former Prince of Wales, 54
15 July – James Scott, 1st Duke of Monmouth, son of King Charles II and Lucy Walter, 36 (executed)
1 September – Sir Leoline Jenkins, academic, jurist and politician, 60
1686
3 December – Richard Vaughan, 2nd Earl of Carbery, Carmarthenshire landowner, politician and soldier
1687
13 February – John Lloyd, Bishop of St David's, 48/9 
1688
25 August – Henry Morgan, privateer
1689
18 April – George Jeffreys, 1st Baron Jeffreys, the "hanging judge"
1690
8 September – Sir William Glynne, 1st Baronet, politician, 62date unknownRhys Cadwaladr, poet
David Edwardes, landowner and herald, about 60
1691
16 March – Elizabeth Herbert, Marchioness of Powis, about 56
March – Bishop Hugh Gore, founder of Swansea Grammar School, 77/8
21 April – Henry Herbert, 4th Baron Herbert of Chirbury
30 October – Henry Maurice, theologian, about 44date unknown – William Price, Royalist colonel
1692
16 January – Thomas Wynne, personal physician of William Penn and one of the original settlers of Philadelphia, 64
22 January – Lewis Owen, politician, 69/70
16 February – David Lloyd, biographer, 56
31 May – Thomas Jones, judge, 77 
September – Richard Williams, politician, about 38date unknownJane Myddelton, court beauty, wife of Charles Myddelton of Ruabon
1693
Sir Trevor Williams, 1st Baronet
22 July – John Davies, translator, 68
22 November – Thomas Phillips, engineer
1694
4 February – Eubule Thelwall, lawyer and landowner, 73
10 September – Thomas Lloyd, lieutenant governor of Pennsylvania date unknown – Siôn Dafydd Las, one of the last household bards
1695
26 March – George Nevill, 12th Baron Bergavenny, 29
28 April – Henry Vaughan, poet, 73
1696
2 June – William Herbert, 1st Marquess of Powis, 69
7 September – John Powell, judge, 63/4
23 December – Sir William Williams, 6th Baronet, politiciandate unknown – Thomas Mackworth, Shropshire politician, married into the Bulkeley family, 68/9
1697
18 January – Sir Erasmus Philipps, 3rd Baronet, of Picton Castle, 63/4
September – Samuel Jones, Nonconformist minister, 69
1698
10 September (buried)'' – Henry Bulkeley, politician, about 57
1699
25 May – Bussy Mansell, politician, 75
May – Pierce Lewis, clergyman and Bible editor, 36
20 August – Thomas Wilkins, antiquarian, 63/65
1700
27 June - Hugh Owen, Independent minister, 60?
11 July - William Williams, Speaker of the House of Commons, 66
September – Sir John Aubrey, 2nd Baronet, politician
8 December - Edward Harley, politician, 76
16 December - Thomas Morgan (of Dderw), politician, 36 (smallpox)

References